The silvery conger (Ariosoma anago) also known as the sea conger, the darkfin conger, the dark-finned conger-eel, or simply the conger eel, is an eel in the family Congridae (conger/garden eels). It was described by Coenraad Jacob Temminck and Hermann Schlegel in 1846, originally under the genus Conger. It is a tropical, marine eel which is known to dwell in sandy and muddy bottoms on coasts in the Indo-west Pacific. Males can reach a maximum total length of 60 centimetres.

The silvery conger's diet consists primarily of benthic crustaceans and finfish.

References

External link

Ariosoma
Taxa named by Coenraad Jacob Temminck
Taxa named by Hermann Schlegel
Fish described in 1846